Bowling – primarily in the form of the tenpin sport, as regulated by the World Bowling organization (the Pan American Games' tenpin events are governed by World Bowling's PABCON American Zone division), has been a sport at the Pan American Games since the 1991 Pan American Games.

Medal table

Discontinued team

Men

Singles

Doubles

Women

Singles

Doubles

Discontinued

Men's All-Events

Men's team

Women's All-Events

Women's team

Events

References
 Sports 123
 bowlingdigital

 
Sports at the Pan American Games
Pan American Games
Pan American Games
Pan American Games